Sjoerd Soeters (born 2 August 1947 in Nes) is a well-known postmodern Dutch architect.  Among other projects, he is known for his work on Amsterdam's Java Island and Houthaven, Copenhagen's Sluseholmen, the apartment complex "The Pyramids" (De Piramides), and for the redevelopment of Zaandam.

References

External links
 Pleasant Places Happy People
 Soeters Van Eldonk

1947 births
Living people
Dutch architects
Eindhoven University of Technology alumni
People from Ameland